Automatic is a punk rock/hardcore punk CD released by the band The Stitches.

Track listing
"(I'm the) Hillside Strangler"
"Automatic"
"Electroshock Carol"

External links

The Stitches albums
2006 albums